Kane Township is one of thirteen townships in Greene County, Illinois, USA.  As of the 2010 census, its population was 995 and it contained 441 housing units.

Geography

Cities, towns, villages
 Kane

Unincorporated towns
 Jalapa at 
 Old Kane at 
(This list is based on USGS data and may include former settlements.)

Extinct towns
 Conwayville at 
 Mid City at 
(These towns are listed as "historical" by the USGS.)

Cemeteries
The township contains these six cemeteries: Burch, Cannedy, Erwin, Kane, Parker and Thompson.
and Mt Pisgah

Major highways
  Illinois Route 267

Demographics

School districts
 Carrollton Community Unit School District 1
 Greenfield Community Unit School District 10
 Jersey Community Unit School District 100

Political districts
 Illinois' 19th congressional district
 State House District 97
 State Senate District 49

References
 
 United States Census Bureau 2007 TIGER/Line Shapefiles
 United States National Atlas

External links
 City-Data.com
 Illinois State Archives

Townships in Greene County, Illinois
Townships in Illinois